The CSA Group (formerly the Canadian Standards Association; CSA) is a standards organization which develops standards in 57 areas. CSA publishes standards in print and electronic form, and provides training and advisory services. CSA is composed of representatives from industry, government, and consumer groups.

CSA began as the Canadian Engineering Standards Association (CESA) in 1919, federally chartered to create standards. During World War I, lack of interoperability between technical resources led to the formation of a standards committee.

CSA is accredited by the Standards Council of Canada, a crown corporation which promotes voluntary standardization in Canada. This accreditation verifies that CSA is competent to carry out standards development and certification functions, and is based on internationally recognised criteria and procedures.

The CSA registered mark shows that a product has been independently tested and certified to meet recognized standards for safety or performance.

History
During World War I, lack of interoperability between  technical resources led to frustration, injury, and death. Britain requested that Canada form a standards committee.

Sir John Kennedy, as chairman of the Civil Engineers' Canadian Advisory Committee, led the investigation into the necessity of an independent Canadian standards organization. As a result, the Canadian Engineering Standards Association (CESA) was established in 1919. CESA was federally chartered to create standards. At the beginning, they attended to specific needs: aircraft parts, bridges, building construction, electrical work, and wire rope. The first standards issued by CESA were for steel railway bridges, in 1920.

In 1927, CESA published the Canadian Electrical Code. Enforcing the code called for product testing, and in 1933, the Hydro-Electric Power Commission of Ontario became the sole source for testing nationwide. In 1940, CESA assumed responsibility for testing and certifying electrical products intended for sale and installation in Canada. CESA was renamed the Canadian Standards Association (CSA) in 1944. The certification mark was introduced in 1946.

In the 1950s, CSA established international alliances in Britain, Japan, and the Netherlands, to expand its scope in testing and certification. Testing labs were expanded from their first in Toronto, to labs in Montreal, Vancouver, and Winnipeg.

In the 1960s, CSA developed national Occupational Health and Safety Standards, creating standards for headgear and safety shoes. By the late 1960s and early 1970s, the CSA began to expand its involvement in consumer standards, including bicycles, credit cards, and child resistant packaging for drugs.

Tom Pashby became chairman of the CSA in 1975, serving for two decades to set standards for manufacturers of ice hockey helmets and lacrosse helmets.

In 1984, CSA established QMI, the Quality Management Institute for registration of ISO9000 and other standards. In 1999, CSA International was established to provide international product testing and certification services while CSA shifted its primary focus to standards development and training. In 2001, these three divisions were joined under the name CSA Group.  In 2004, OnSpeX was launched as the fourth division of CSA Group. In 2008, QMI was sold to SAI-Global for $40 million.

In 2009, CSA purchased SIRA.

Standards development

CSA exists to develop standards. Among the fifty-seven different areas of specialization are business management and safety and performance standards, including those for electrical and electronic equipment, industrial equipment, boilers and pressure vessels, compressed gas handling appliances, environmental protection, and construction materials.

Most standards are voluntary, meaning there are no laws requiring their application. Despite that, adherence to standards is beneficial to companies because it shows products have been independently tested to meet certain standards. The CSA mark is a registered certification mark, and can only be applied by someone who is licensed or otherwise authorised to do so by the CSA.

CSA developed the CAN/CSA Z299 series, now called N299, of quality assurance standards, which are still in use today.  They are an alternative to the ISO 9001 quality management standard, specific to companies supplying goods to nuclear power plants.

Laws and regulations in most municipalities, provinces and states in North America require certain products to be tested to a specific standard or group of standards by a Nationally Recognized Testing Laboratory (NRTL).  Currently forty percent of all the standards issued by CSA are referenced in Canadian legislation.  CSA's sister company CSA International is a Nationally Recognized Testing Laboratory which manufacturers can choose, usually because the law of the jurisdiction requires it, or the customer specifies it.

Keyboard

References

External links

1919 establishments in Ontario
Certification marks
Electrical safety standards organizations
Organizations based in Mississauga
Organizations established in 1919
Product-testing organizations
Standards organizations in Canada